Ferenc Nagy (footballer) (21 February 1884 – 1964) was a Hungarian footballer and coach.

He played eight matches for Hungarian national football team.

1925 he was the team mangager of Estonian national football team.

References

External links
 

1884 births
1964 deaths
Hungarian footballers
Hungarian football managers
Association football defenders
MTK Budapest FC players
Estonia national football team managers